"I'm No Latino" is a dance-pop song written by Ahmad Darwich and Dorthe Hansen and produced by Darwich at the Panic Studio in Aalborg for TG Production Denmark. Recorded by the Dutch singer EliZe in 2005, she released the song as the third single from her 2006 debut album In Control. Released on August 22, 2005 in the Netherlands, this single reached the number 14 position, spending 6 weeks in the Dutch Top 40 chart. The music video, directed by Jonathan Weyland, became the 'TMF SuperClip' for the week after its introduction.

Review

A review in Artistopia.com says:

Track listings and formats

CD single
"I'm No Latino" [radio edit] – 3:05
"I'm No Latino" [extended edit] – 3:58
"I'm No Latino" [karaoke version] – 3:03
"I'm No Latino" [enhanced video] – 03:02

Digital download
"I'm No Latino" [radio edit] – 3:05
"I'm No Latino" [extended edit] – 3:58
"I'm No Latino" [karaoke version] – 3:03

Charts

Personnel

Production
Vocal production by Hartmann & Langhoff for TG Production Denmark.
Lyrics co-ordination by Chris Willemsen.
Mastering by AR Digital Mastering.
Published by T.G. Publishing/MundoMusic/MusicAllStars.

Single Photography
Photography: William Rutten
Styling: Moon V. (New Impulse Fashion, Rosa Cha, Mippies, Icoon Amstelveen, Colours of Asia, Ottitude)
Hairstyling & Make-up: Jedidjah Kuijten
Design: René van der Weijde - TFX

Music Video
Directed by Jonathan Weyland.

References

External links
"I'm No Latino" lyrics

EliZe songs
2005 singles
2005 songs
Spinnin' Records singles